Selma High School (SHS) is a public high school located in the city  of Selma, California, United States. It is part of the Selma Unified School District.

Administration
Dr. Fisher - Superintendent
Guillermo Lopez - Principal

Football

The Selma High football program is one of the longest tenured football programs in the Central Valley, with the inaugural season starting back in 1894. Selma won its first Section Championship in 1909, defeating Sanger 19-0. 6 years later in 1915 Selma won there second Section Championship. Selma’s third Section title came in 1954 when they won the Sequoia-Valley Title. In 1980 Selma was dominant and won a Sequoia-Sierra Valley title behind the arm former San Diego State University Quarterback Todd Santos, for there fourth title in school history. In the mid 1990s Dean Cardoza took over the program and held that post until stepping down after the 2004 season. Under Cardoza Selma had limited success and he ended his career with a 13-game losing streak. Selma was then able to hire former Hanford West head coach Justin Fowler in March 2005. Fowler in his third season, after two winless seasons, ended Selma's 34 game losing streak and helped the bears clinch a berth in the playoffs. Fowler stayed with the program before abruptly leaving for the head coaching position at Mt. Whitney HS in Visalia, CA in the Summer of 2009. Succeeding Fowler was Mike Crews, who previously left Ridgeview HS in Bakersfield, CA.  Crews compiled a 22-31 record while leading Selma to its first home playoff win since 1980 in the fall of 2010. Crews resigned concluding the 2014 season. Following Crews’ departure the Bears went after former Sanger High School defensive coordinator Matt Logue. Logue, who was an All American Linebacker at Sacramento State Hornets, brought stingy defense and tough running offense to Selma. During the 2016 Varsity football season the Bears held an undefeated 13-0 record and won there fifth CIF Central Section Valley Championship (Division 4). 3 years later Logue and the Bears played the whole season on the road, due to Stacey Stadium renovation, and capped off there season at 11-3 while winning the schools 6th Central Section Title (Division 4). Following the 2021 season Matt Logue left Selma to return to Sanger High School. In March of 2022 Selma announced former Washington Union head coach Art Francis as there new head coach.

Athletics
Selma High School competes in the Central Section of the California Interscholastic Federation as a member of the Central Sequoia League. 

Fall
Girl's & Boy's Water Polo
Football
Volleyball
Cross Country
Girls' Golf
Girls' Tennis
Winter
Boys' Basketball
Girls' Basketball
Boys' Soccer
Girls' Soccer
Wrestling
Spring
Baseball
Softball
Swimming
Track & Field
Boys' Golf
Boys' Tennis

Alumni

 Lloyd Allen, Major League Baseball pitcher
 Jaime Cerda, Major League Baseball pitcher
 Bobby Cox
 Andrea Duran
 Victor Davis Hanson
 Dashrit Pandher

References

High schools in Fresno County, California
Public high schools in California
1906 establishments in California